The Independent Grouping for Reflection (GIR) was a political party in the Central African Republic. The GIR was led by François Pehoua, a former minister in the Bokassa cabinet. Pehoua was the GIR candidate in the 1981 presidential elections, finishing third of five candidates with 5% of the vote. GIR was generally based amongst bureaucrats and technocrats.

References

Defunct political parties in the Central African Republic
Political parties with year of disestablishment missing
Political parties with year of establishment missing